Quimica Perfecta is the third studio album by Magnate & Valentino released on September 22, 2009.

Track listing

Mixed by GiovaLowva

2009 albums
Magnate & Valentino albums